Humala may refer to:

People
Ollanta Humala (born 1963), former Peruvian president
Antauro Humala, Peruvian military commander
Isaac Humala (born 1936), Peruvian Pan-Americanism theorist
Ulises Humala, Peruvian engineer and politician

Other uses
Humala, Estonia
Humulus, the genus containing the hop species H. lupulus

Quechuan-language surnames